Timur Aslanovich Bizhoev (born 22 March, in Kabardino-Balkaria is a Russian freestyle wrestler. He is a bronze medalist in the men's 74 kg event at both the 2019 European Wrestling Championships held in Bucharest, Romania and the 2021 World Wrestling Championships held in Oslo, Norway.

Career  

He won one of the bronze medals in the 74 kg event at the 2019 European Wrestling Championships held in Bucharest, Romania. A year earlier, he also won one of the bronze medals in this event at the 2018 U23 World Wrestling Championships, also held in Bucharest, Romania.

In 2020, he won one of the bronze medals in the men's 74 kg event at the Russian National Freestyle Wrestling Championships.

Major results

References

External links 
 

Living people
Place of birth missing (living people)
Russian male sport wrestlers
European Wrestling Championships medalists
1996 births
World Wrestling Championships medalists
Sportspeople from Kabardino-Balkaria
21st-century Russian people